Craig Giles is an internationally acclaimed, award-winning Australian musician. Also known as 'Mr. Versatile', he is best known for his country music and ballad singing, and tours around Australia and across the world.

Personal life 
Giles currently resides in Temora with his wife Roz, who is the head of entertainment agency, Big River Entertainment.

Awards and achievements 

 1998 – Inducted into the Australian Country Music Hands of Fame
 2000 – Best Country Male Entertainer in A.C.M.L.A. People's Choice Awards
 2003 – Nominated in the C.M.A.A. Top Ten Independent Entertainers of the Year
 2005 – Open Contemporary Section of the Tasmanian & New Zealand Songwriters Contest
 2006 – Australian Artist on Tour in the National Australian Country Recording Awards
 2007 – Finalist in Male Vocal, Album & Song sections of the People's Choice Awards
 2007 – Australian Artist on Tour in the National Australian Country Recording Awards
 2008 – Finalist in Bush Ballad section of the Horsham Music Awards
 2009 – Country Artist on Tour at the A.C.A. Awards

Discography
 Craig Giles Sings for You (1988) 
 25th Anniversary Album (2013)

References

External links 
 Official Website

Australian country singer-songwriters
Musicians from New South Wales